The Program on Corporations, Law, and Democracy (POCLAD) is an activist collective of 11 members(with three leaving, making 14.), who research the history of corporations in the United States. They are some of the main circulators of the notion that corporate personhood—which gives corporations some of the same legal rights as real human beings—is at the center of the problems regarding corporations.  They also publish a newsletter three times a year called By What Authority English for quo warranto, a legal phrase that questions illegitimate exercise of privilege and power, which they claim reflects an unabashed assertion of the right of the sovereign people to govern themselves.

Collective members 
David Cobb
Greg Coleridge
Karen Coulter
Mike Ferner
Dave Henson
Ward Morehouse
Lewis Pitts
Jim Price
Virginia Rasmussen
Kaitlin Sopoci-Belknap
Mary Zepernick

Former members 
 Richard Grossman
 Peter Kellman
 Jane Anne Morris

See also 
Ohio Committee on Corporations, Law, and Democracy
Democracy Unlimited of Humboldt County

External links
Official site
Democracy Unlimited of Humboldt County

Organizations based in Massachusetts